Agata Perenc  (born 19 March 1990) is a Polish judoka.

She is the silver medallist of the 2018 Judo Grand Prix Cancún in the -52 kg category.

In 2021, she represented Poland at the 2020 Summer Olympics in Tokyo, Japan. She competed in the women's 52 kg event.

References

External links
 

1990 births
Living people
Polish female judoka
Judoka at the 2020 Summer Olympics
Olympic judoka of Poland
European Games competitors for Poland
Judoka at the 2015 European Games
Judoka at the 2019 European Games
21st-century Polish women